Menin is a protein that in humans is encoded by the MEN1 gene. Menin is a putative tumor suppressor associated with multiple endocrine neoplasia type 1 (MEN-1 syndrome).

In vitro studies have shown that menin is localized to the nucleus, possesses two functional nuclear localization signals, and inhibits transcriptional activation by JunD.  However, the function of this protein is not known. Two messages have been detected on northern blots but the larger message has not been characterized. Two variants of the shorter transcript have been identified where alternative splicing affects the coding sequence. Five variants where alternative splicing takes place in the 5' UTR have also been identified.

History

In 1988, researchers at Uppsala University Hospital and the Karolinska Institute in Stockholm mapped the MEN1 gene to the long arm of chromosome 11. The gene was finally cloned in 1997.

Genomics

The gene is located on long arm of chromosome 11 (11q13) between base pairs 64,570,985 and 64,578,765. It has 10 exons and encodes a 610-amino acid protein.

Over 1300 mutations have been reported to date (2010). The majority (>70%) of these are predicted to lead to truncated forms are scattered throughout the gene. Four - c.249_252delGTCT (deletion at codons 83-84), c.1546_1547insC (insertion at codon 516), c.1378C>T (Arg460Ter) and c.628_631delACAG (deletion at codons 210-211) have been reported to occur in 4.5%, 2.7%, 2.6% and 2.5% of families.

Clinical implications 

The MEN1 phenotype is inherited via an autosomal-dominant pattern and is associated with neoplasms of the pituitary gland, the parathyroid gland, and the pancreas (the 3 "P"s).  While these neoplasias are often benign (in contrast to tumours occurring in MEN2A), they are adenomas and, therefore, produce endocrine phenotypes. Pancreatic presentations of the MEN1 phenotype may manifest as Zollinger-Ellison syndrome.

MEN1 pituitary tumours are adenomas of anterior cells, typically prolactinomas or growth hormone-secreting.  Pancreatic tumours involve the islet cells, giving rise to gastrinomas or insulinomas.  In rare cases, adrenal cortex tumours are also seen.

Role in cancer 
Most germline or somatic mutations in the MEN1 gene predict truncation or absence of encoded menin resulting in the inability of MEN1 to act as a tumor suppressor gene.  Such mutations in MEN1 have been associated with defective binding of encoded menin to proteins implicated in genetic and epigenetic mechanisms. Menin is a 621 amino acid protein associated with insulinomas which acts as an adapter while also interacting with partner proteins involved in vital cell activities such as transcriptional regulation, cell division, cell proliferation, and genome stability.  Insulinomas are neuroendocrine tumors of the pancreas with an incidence of 0.4 % which usually are benign solitary tumors but 5-12 % of cases have distant metastasis at diagnosis.  These familial MEN-1 and sporadic tumors may arise either due to loss of heterozygosity or the chromosome region 11q13 where MEN1 is located, or due to presence of mutations in the gene.

MEN1 mutations comprise mostly frameshift deletions or insertions, followed by nonsense, missense, splice-site mutations and either part or complete gene deletions resulting in disease pathology.  Frameshift and nonsense mutations result in a supposed inactive and truncated menin protein while splice-site mutations result in incorrectly spliced mRNA.  Missense mutations of MEN1 are especially important as they result in a change to crucial amino acids needed in order to bind and interact with other proteins and molecules. As menin is located predominantly in the nucleus, these mutations can impact the stability of the cell and may further affect functional activity or expression levels of the protein.  Studies have also shown that single amino acid changes in genes involved in oncogenic disorders may result in proteolytic degradation leading to loss of function and reduced stability of the mutant protein; a common mechanism for inactivating tumor suppressor gene products. MEN1 gene mutations and deletions also play a role in the development of hereditary and a subgroup of sporadic pituitary adenomas and were detected in approximately 5% of sporadic pituitary adenomas. Consequently, alterations of the gene represent a candidate pathogenetic mechanism of pituitary tumorigenesis especially when considered in terms of interactions with other proteins, growth factors, oncogenes play a rule in tumorigenesis.

Although the exact function of MEN1 is not known, the Knudson "two-hit" hypothesis provides strong evidence that it is a tumor suppressor gene. Familial loss of one copy of MEN1 is seen in association with MEN-1 syndrome. Tumor suppressor carcinogenesis follows Knudson's "two-hit" model. The first hit is a heterozygous MEN1 germline mutation either developed in an early embryonic stage and consequently present in all cells at birth for the sporadic cases, or inherited from one parent in a familial case.  The second hit is a MEN1 somatic mutation, oftentimes a large deletion occurring in the predisposed endocrine cell and providing cells with the survival advantaged needed for tumor development. The MEN-1 syndrome often exhibits tumors of parathyroid glands, anterior pituitary, endocrine pancreas, and endocrine duodenum.  Less frequently, neuroendocrine tumors of lung, thymus, and stomach or non-endocrine tumors such as lipomas, angiofibromas, and ependymomas are observed neoplasms.

In a study of 12 sporadic carcinoid tumors of the lung, five cases involved inactivation of both copies of the MEN1 gene.  Of the five carcinoids, three were atypical and two were typical.  The two typical carcinoids were characterized by a rapid proliferative rate with a higher mitotic index and stronger Ki67 positivity than the other typical carcinoids in the study. Consequently, the carcinoid tumors with MEN1 gene inactivation in the study were considered to be characterized by more aggressive molecular and histopathological features than those without MEN1 gene alterations.

Interactions 

MEN1 has been shown to interact with:
 FANCD2,
 GFAP,
 JunD,
 NFKB1, 
 MLL,
 RPA2, and
 VIM.

References

Further reading

External links 
  GeneReviews/NIH/NCBI/UW entry on Multiple Endocrine Neoplasia Type 1
 MEN1 gene variant database